Kalkanovo (Qalqan) is a rural locality (a village) in Uchalinsky Selsoviet, Uchalinsky District, Bashkortostan, Russia. The population was 332 as of 2010. There are 5 streets.

Geography 
Kalkanovo is located 18 km northwest of Uchaly (the district's administrative centre) by road. Yuldashevo and Urgunovo are the nearest rural localities.

References 

Rural localities in Uchalinsky District